A medical tourism agent (also health tourism provider or medical tourism provider) is an organisation or a company which seeks to bring together a prospective patient with a service provider, usually a hospital or a clinic. These organisations are generally facilitators and developers of medical tourism, which brings into play a number of issues that do not apply when a patient stays within their own country of origin.

Some of these organisations and companies specialise in certain areas of healthcare, such as cosmetic surgery, dentistry or transplant surgery, while others are more generalised in their approach, providing multiple services over a wide range of medical specialities. These organisations may also focus on providing services in a single country or they may provide access to treatment across multiple nations.

Medical quality standards vary around the world, and international accreditation is relatively new. For these reasons, potential clients may face unknowns and risks related to quality, safety and ethics. Medical tourists look to health tourism providers to provide information about quality, safety and legal issues, but the quality of such information and services varies on the size, scale and the standards of the facilitators themselves.

Types of agencies 
These agencies can be categorised based on the extent of their services and their scale of operations. In general, larger companies provide more services in more locations and with more hospitals/clinics.

Single person operations 
These are 'one man shows' or agents who are usually former medical tourists themselves or doctors with ties to specific hospitals. They generally promote their services through a network of references and local advertisements and due their limited size and capabilities, they do not provide many services and usually rely on the referred hospital and the medical traveller to make the necessary arrangements for medical travel.

Since they rely on the referred hospital for a significant amount of logistical support, such operators usually work with one or very few hospitals. Their source of income are referral fees paid by the hospital for each medical tourist.

Destination focused agencies 
These companies focus on a single medical destination such as a particular region or a country and promote medical care in hospitals/clinics in that location. Since they are usually larger and more organised, they offer services such as airport pickups, hotel accommodation, translators and other services that they medical traveller may require, their services are advertised through a website, marketing and also a network of former clients and doctors.

The revenue model for these organisations relies on service charges billed on the medical traveller and also on the referral fees from the hospital.

Global agencies 
These companies offer a global reach and tend not to generalize treatment types, offering everything from dental, medical to plastic and cosmetic procedures. These companies concentrate on informing the customer and providing a wide variety of hospitals and clinics on a single website or platform, whilst offering assistance throughout the entire process. Platforms are able to leverage their superior knowledge of each local area to offer advice on which hospitals/clinics offer which procedures and at what cost. They do not, however, offer medical advice, this comes directly from the medical professionals at the chosen facility. The service is completely free to the consumer, their revenue comes in the form of a referral fee, directly from the medical facilities. Usually the amount is agreed upon in advance and can range from 5-30% of the total medical bill.

People from Africa will travel in large numbers to India for quality and affordable medical treatments. Mainly to overcome huge treatment cost in private hospitals and lower quality public healthcare.

Practices

Medical tourism or health tourism providers assist travellers in planning their medical travel. They offer complete information on medical facilities, service providers, medical professionals, travel agencies, resorts, medical/travel insurance overseas as well as of local areas. Millions of medical travellers travel overseas for their medical, dental, and cosmetic procedures.

Health tourism providers make information available about the hospitals, clinic and the doctors that they are partnered with, but the nature, extent and quality of the information provided by different organisations and companies working in this field varies enormously. Hospital quality indicators can include whether they have been subjected to independent international healthcare accreditation, practice evidence-based medicine, and good governance, and whether independent health care staff, particularly the doctors providing the services, have been subjected to independent credentialing, as well as evidence that the doctors maintain and improve their personal professional standards.

In addition, there are a number of non-medical angles which receive varying degrees of attention by providers.  These include:

 Prices and how to pay
 Hotels
 Non-medical risks involved
 Language issues
 Availability of techniques (e.g. new operations, new approaches to infertility, new imaging techniques)
 Pre-travel health issues, such as antimalarial therapy (e.g. for Thailand) and relevant immunisations (e.g. typhoid and hepatitis A are recommended for travelling to Turkey or the Philippines)
 Ethics (for example, see Organ harvesting in China)
 Medico-legal issues (e.g. are the doctors providing the treatment adequately indemnified or carrying personal malpractice insurance?  Is the hospital itself adequately insured?  Can a patient sue if things go wrong ?  Will the hospital repatriate the body of a patient who dies on the operating table ?)

In 2006 the group CEO of Bumrungrad Hospital in Thailand, stated "If there's a mistake, we fix it..... But the idea of suing for multimillions of dollars for damages is not going to be something you can do outside the U.S."  However, Americans and Europeans going overseas as medical tourists may not be able to take effective legal action if they are dissatisfied with their experience.  The Medical Protection Society, a British group, is responsible for indemnifying doctors in many countries, including Singapore, Hong Kong, Malaysia and Brunei, which increases the level of protection enjoyed both by patients locally as well as those coming in as medical tourists. This service is not free.

There are many good hospitals and there is absolutely no reason to make it unsafe. The problem is that many prospective patients treat medical tourism the same way as online shopping. In a surgery, cheaper is not always better. Mr. Bob Talasila, the president of American medical tourism company World Medical and Surgical LLC echo the same feelings.

Standards
Currently, while hospitals providing medical tourism services may be subject to international accreditation by a reputable independent international group, there is currently no organisation responsible for accrediting the health tourism providers themselves and ensuring that their operating standards are safe and ethical.
The Medical Tourism Association is encouraging everyone in the medical tourism field to follow their guidelines and become a part of this association in order to create a well recognize organisation in this matter.

See also
Quality assurance
Medical tourism
Hospital accreditation
International healthcare accreditation
Evidence-based medicine

References

Quality assurance
Accreditation in healthcare
Medical tourism